Lambda Iota Tau was an American international honor society for literature, whose purpose was to recognize and promote excellence in the study of literature in all languages. It was admitted to the Association of College Honor Societies (ACHS) in 1965. It was absorbed by Sigma Tau Delta in 2016-2017.

Lambda Iota Tau was founded at Michigan State University on December 3, 1953, and was incorporated in 1954 by representatives of chapters at Aquinas College (Michigan), Baldwin Wallace University, Eastern Michigan University, Marygrove College, Mercy College of Detroit, Purdue University, Sioux Falls College, and the University of Detroit. The society had forty-six active chapters with a total membership of approximately 40,000.

The society was a nonprofit organization. Elected officers of Lambda Iota Tau were the international executive secretary, the international assistant executive secretary, the treasurer, and the international board of chapter advisers. The international executive secretary conducted the affairs of the society, arranged for and presides over all international meetings, and consulted with the international board in all actions affecting the society as a whole. The treasurer received all dues and paid all financial obligations of the society. The international board of chapter advisers consisted of five chapter advisers from five geographical areas. The board elected its own president, determined and initiated new policies within the constitutional limitations of the society, ratified the appointments of the secretaries and treasurer, nominates candidates for all elective offices, corresponded with the chapters in their geographical areas, and determineed the international dues.

Members were students majoring or minoring in literature, including literature written in foreign languages, who were in the upper 35 percent of their class in cumulative grade point average, had attained at least a full B average in at least twelve semester credit hours or eighteen term hours of literature and all prerequisites thereto, were enrolled in at least their fifth college semester or seventh college term, and had presented an initiation paper. The initiation paper was presented in such a manner as the local chapter requires, was of a quality certified by the chapter adviser, and was on a literary topic (research or critical) or of a creative nature (short story, essay, poem, drama). Graduate students must have had completed one semester term with an A-average.

Members were initiated into local chapters established and maintained only at colleges or universities that granted the baccalaureate or higher degrees and that were accredited by the appropriate regional agency and certain appropriate professional accrediting agencies. The local chapters were approved by the administrations of their institutions.

Lambda Iota Tau published its annual journal LIT, which included noteworthy poems, short stories, essays, and critical analyses written by its members. The best piece in each category of LIT was awarded a publication prize. The society also published a semiannual newsletter. In addition, several scholarships were awarded to the membership each year.

Chapters were encouraged to hold regular meetings and to sponsor events and activities that would bring the study of literature to the attention of the campus at large. Chapters sponsored such projects as the appearance of outstanding speakers on their campuses, motion pictures based on works of literature, publications of student creative and critical writing, and library exhibits. They also held book sales to foster more reading of literature. Some chapters volunteered for local Habitat for Humanity projects and various local literacy projects.

The international office has in the past sponsored lectures by famous individuals such as John Crowe Ransom, Robert Lowell, and Richard Eberhart. The society previously conferred honorary memberships on individuals who have made worthy contributions to some area of literature, language, or linguistics, or who had demonstrated proficiency in teaching, scholarship, criticism, or creative writing. The society also bestowed an honorary presidency on a literary figure who had achieved distinction in both critical and creative writing. Honorary presidents have included W. H. Auden, Archibald MacLeish, Daniel Hoffman, Robert Penn Warren, Richard Eberhart, Richard Marius, and Robert Pinsky.

Closure
Lambda Iota Tau dissolved in 2016-2017  and the organization has been absorbed by Sigma Tau Delta; Sigma Tau Delta allowed their chapters and members "to come in during a brief period," and agreed to "memorialize the Society in some way."

Notes

Former members of Association of College Honor Societies
Honor societies
Michigan State University
Fraternities and sororities in the United States
Literary societies
Student organizations established in 1953
Defunct fraternities and sororities
1953 establishments in Michigan